Haplolabida is a genus of moths in the family Geometridae. It was described by David Stephen Fletcher in 1958.

Type species: Haplolabida monticolata (Aurivillius, 1910)

Species
Species of this genus include:
Haplolabida coaequata (Prout, 1935)
Haplolabida diplodonta D. S. Fletcher, 1958
Haplolabida inaequata (Walker, 1861)
Haplolabida lacrimans Herbulot, 1970
Haplolabida marojejensis Herbulot, 1963
Haplolabida monticolata (Aurivillius, 1910)
Haplolabida pauliani Viette, 1975
Haplolabida sjostedti (Aurivillius, 1910)
Haplolabida viettei Herbulot, 1970

References

Larentiinae